Sportvereniging Excelsior '31, is a football club from Rijssen, Netherlands. It was founded on 31 May 1931. It plays Hoofdklasse since 2014, when it relegated from the Topklasse. Excelsior'31 became champions in the Hoofdklasse in 2019 and got promoted to the derde divisie. The 4th tier in Dutch Football.  It had promoted to the Topklasse in 2010.

References

External links

 
Football clubs in the Netherlands
Association football clubs established in 1931
1931 establishments in the Netherlands
Football clubs in Rijssen-Holten